This section of List of Liberty ships is a sortable list of Liberty ships—cargo ships built in the United States during World War II—with names beginning with A through F.

A through F

Notes

References 
 

Lists of Liberty ships
 A